Angur Azuj (also Romanized as Angūr Āzūj) is a village west Alamut Rural District, Alamut-e Gharbi District, Qazvin County, Qazvin Province, Iran. At the 2006 census, its population was 73, in 25 families.

References 

Populated places in Qazvin County